Florin Alexandru Cioablă (born 23 April 1996) is a Romanian professional footballer who plays as a forward for Liga III side CSM Alexandria.

Honours

Club
Viitorul Constanța
Liga I: 2016–17

References

External links
 
 

1996 births
Living people
Sportspeople from Craiova
Romanian footballers
Association football forwards
Liga I players
Liga II players
Liga III players
FC Viitorul Constanța players
CS Șoimii Pâncota players
FC Rapid București players
FC Argeș Pitești players
LPS HD Clinceni players
CS Concordia Chiajna players
CSM Reșița players